R v O.N.E. was a legal case heard in 2001 before the Supreme Court of Canada. It was an appeal against a ban on publication of details of the police investigation of a murder case. The appeal was allowed.

Finding
Judge Iacobucci J. wrote for a unanimous Court that the appeal raised substantially similar issues to those considered by the Court in R v Mentuck.  He concluded that the publication ban sought should not have been ordered by the trial judge in light of the appropriate common law test for a publication ban. The appeal was therefore allowed.  The publication ban, which was varied by the Court, was declared effective for a period of one year following the release of this judgment, because by that time, the operations in which the police officers were then involved should be completed.

References

Canadian freedom of expression case law
Supreme Court of Canada cases
2001 in Canadian case law
Publication bans in Canadian case law